Paradoliopsidae is a family of tunicates belonging to the order Doliolida.

Genera:
 Paradoliopsis Godeaux, 1996

References

Tunicates